Esmat Shanwary (Dari:  عصمت شنواری;) born (9 October 1993) in Kabul is an Afghan footballer who plays as a midfielder for FC Lienden.

Youth
Shanwary played in the youth of VV Sluiskil, GVV '57, N.E.C., N.E.C./FC Oss and FC Utrecht before joining Achilles '29 in 2014.

Career
Shanwary signed his first professional contract for FC Utrecht. Many clubs where interested in signing him but he said no to clubs like De Graafschap, PSV and his former club N.E.C. Shanwary was on trial at De Graafschap and PSV and made a good impression but FC Utrecht came with the best offer. In his first match for FC Utrecht he got injured which ended his season. In the 2014–2015 season Shanwary played for First Division club Achilles '29. Esmat made his debut in an away match against Jong PSV as a substitute. Shanwary made his debut in the KNVB Beker as a substitute against FC Twente. Esmat signed a contract with Topklasse club GVVV in May 2015. On 15 December 2015 the club of Shanwary decided to not give a new contract. He had to leave the club. Shanwary signed a contract with HSV Hoek in November.

International career
Shanwary was called up for the Afghan national team for a friendly match against Kyrgyzstan on 31 March 2015. Because of a heavy snow storm the match was cancelled. Eventually he made his debut against Laos in a friendly match. They won the match with 2–0. Shanwary played his second game for the Afghan national team against Bangladesh. He came in the second half as a substitute. He scored in the last minutes of the game with a beautiful shot which made the score end in a 1–1 draw.

International goals

Career statistics

Club performance

Statistics accurate as of last match played on 26 March 2015.

1 Includes UEFA Champions League and UEFA Europa League matches.

2 Includes Johan Cruijff Shield matches.

Personal life
Shanwary holds both Dutch and Afghan passports.

References

External links

Living people
Pashtun people
1993 births
Afghan footballers
Afghan emigrants to the Netherlands
Afghanistan international footballers
Afghan expatriate sportspeople in the Netherlands
Association football midfielders
Dutch people of Pashtun descent
Footballers from Kabul
Achilles '29 players
GVVV players
HSV Hoek players
FC Lienden players
Eerste Divisie players
Derde Divisie players